Confederation Beach Park (known as Confederation Park until 2016) is a Tourist Area/Park in Hamilton, Ontario. The park includes: Wild Waterworks, an outdoor waterpark; Adventure Village, an amusement centre with laser tag, bumper cars and an 18-hole mini golf course; and a fast food diner restaurant with a 1950s motif called Hutch's. There is also a restaurant/entertainment centre called Barangas on the Beach. There is an observation tower, a beachfront restaurant, a swimming pool, beach and trail, and a go-kart track. There was a full-sized amusement park until 1978.  It is also the namesake for nearby planned GO train station, Confederation GO Station.

References

Parks in Hamilton, Ontario